The Topeka Senators were a  minor league baseball team based in Topeka, Kansas United States that played on-and-off from 1924 to 1934 that played in the Western Association (1924), Southwestern League (1925–1926) and Western League (1930–1931 and 1933–1934). In 1925, under the guidance of managers Bill Meyer and Dutch Wetzel, they won their league's championship.

References

Baseball teams established in 1924
Defunct minor league baseball teams
Sports in Topeka, Kansas
Baseball teams disestablished in 1934
1924 establishments in Kansas
1934 disestablishments in Kansas
Defunct baseball teams in Kansas
Defunct Western Association teams
Defunct Western League teams
Defunct Southwestern League teams